Bowen was an electoral district of the Legislative Assembly in the Australian state of Queensland from 1873 to 1950 and at various times until 1992.

History

The electoral district of Bowen was established by the 1872 Electoral Districts Act.

During the First McIlwraith Ministry, the seat of Bowen was occupied by three Attorneys-General: Henry Beor, Pope Alexander Cooper and Charles E. Chubb. Upon Beor's death, Cooper, who was not at that time in Parliament, was appointed Attorney-General and contested and won the resulting by-election. When he resigned, Chubb entered parliament in the same manner.

Bowen is the only state or federal electorate in Australia to elect a Communist member, Fred Paterson, who served as member for Bowen from the 1944 election until the 1950 election.

In a 1949 redistribution, Bowen was abolished, being split between the new electoral districts of Burdekin and Whitsunday. It has been suggested that the redistribution was done deliberately to split Paterson's electoral support and prevent him from being returned to parliament in the 1950 election. Paterson contested Whitsunday but was unsuccessful.

From 1963 until 1971, member Peter Delamothe also served as Attorney-General.

Today, the electoral districts of Whitsunday and Burdekin comprise parts of the former Electoral district of Bowen.

Members

Election results

See also
 Electoral districts of Queensland
 Members of the Queensland Legislative Assembly by year
 :Category:Members of the Queensland Legislative Assembly by name

References

Former electoral districts of Queensland